Meuli is a surname. Notable people with this surname include:

 Daniela Meuli (born 1981), Swiss snowboarder
 Denzil Meuli (1926–2019), New Zealand priest
 Judith Meuli (1938–2007), American feminist, activist, and scientist
 Ted Meuli (1926–2007), New Zealand cricket player